Raheem Adewole Lawal (born 4 May 1990) is a Nigerian professional footballer who plays as a midfielder.

Career
Lawal has played club football in Spain and Turkey for Atlético Baleares, Adana Demirspor and Mersin İdmanyurdu. On 3 February 2014, Lawal joined Turkish Süper Lig side Eskişehirspor, signing a three-and-a-half year deal.

He made his international debut for Nigeria in 2012, and has appeared in FIFA World Cup qualifying matches.

References

 Eskişehir'de, Lawal ile yollar ayrıldı, geripas.net, 8 January 2016
 Raheem Lawal joins Osmanlispor, goal.com, 13 January 2016
 emaratalyoum.com 3 October 2018

External links
 

1990 births
Living people
Nigerian footballers
CD Atlético Baleares footballers
Adana Demirspor footballers
Al-Ittihad Kalba SC players
Mersin İdman Yurdu footballers
Eskişehirspor footballers
Ankaraspor footballers
Kayserispor footballers
Segunda División B players
Süper Lig players
TFF First League players
UAE Pro League players
Nigerian expatriate footballers
Nigeria international footballers
Expatriate footballers in Spain
Expatriate footballers in Turkey
Expatriate footballers in the United Arab Emirates
Nigerian expatriate sportspeople in Spain
Nigerian expatriate sportspeople in Turkey
Nigerian expatriate sportspeople in the United Arab Emirates
Association football midfielders